Migné-Auxances is a commune in the Vienne department in the Nouvelle-Aquitaine region in western France.

History

On 17 December 1826, the village of Migné witnesses the appearance of a luminous cross in the sky, in front of more than 2000 people gathered on the occasion of the planting of a cross in the village cemetery. Standing about fifty meters above the ground, lying in the direction of the West, about forty yards in length, it was visible from seventeen to seventeen. His presence was predicted seven years before his appearance by the abbot Suffrant (1755-1828), parish priest of Maumusson (Loire-Inferieure) and an ecclesiastic M. Vrindts.

Population

See also
Communes of the Vienne department

References

Communes of Vienne